() is a 1958 Swiss-West German-Spanish thriller film directed by Ladislao Vajda. The original screenplay was written by Friedrich Dürrenmatt, a Swiss playwright and novelist, and the first incarnation of the film is still acclaimed by critics. Heinz Rühmann and Gert Fröbe both starred in the 1958 movie.

Plot
Matthäi, a senior detective with the Zürich police, is about to take up a post in the Middle East when a call comes in that a peddler has found the body of a little girl in the woods. With the peddler he inspects the site and, when none of the other police volunteer, says he will tell the parents. Distraught, the mother asks him to swear that he will find the killer.

He goes to the little girls' school, where another child points out a picture the dead girl had drawn. It shows a tall man in a long black coat, a large black car, a little girl, a horned creature, and some black hedgehogs. The villagers think the peddler was the murderer, as does Matthäi's successor who, after a long hard interrogation, gets a confession. That night the peddler hangs himself in his cell.

The police consider the case closed. Matthäi, however, believes the peddler was innocent and that the culprit is a serial killer who has murdered two other little girls and may strike again. As he takes his seat in the airliner, the man next to him is eating chocolate truffles which look just like the hedgehogs in the drawing. Realising that the killer may have befriended the little girl with chocolates, he leaps off the plane, but his successor is uninterested. Deciding to solve the case on his own, a psychiatrist friend suggests that the drawing is true. Such a killer is intimidated by grown women, and gets his revenge by murdering little girls. He must be childless himself.

Plotting the three murder sites on the map, Matthäi sees that they were all beside the main highway from Zürich to Chur. The heraldic animal of Chur is the horned chamois, which appears on its vehicle number plates. He rents a filling station on the road, where he takes the numbers of cars from Chur, traces their owners, and under various pretexts rings up to find out if they have children. Seeing a lonely little girl in the village, he befriends her, learning that her name is Annemarie and that her mother is alone and unmarried. He invites mother and daughter to live in the filling station and encourages the child to play beside the road.

Driving from Chur to Zürich in his large black car, a businessman named Schrott sees Annemarie playing and stops at the filling station, though his tank is nearly full. Matthäi finds out his home number, where his wife says that her two sons are out in the world. A few days later, Schrott hides his car in the woods and in his long black coat entices Annemarie with a glove puppet. He tells her nobody must know of their encounter.

When Annemarie is late back from school one day, Matthäi sees chocolate stains on her hands and finds hedgehog truffles in her pocket. He orders the mother to take the child somewhere safe and, buying a shop window dummy, dresses it in Annemarie's clothes. Laying his bait in the woods, he alerts the local police and they keep watch for the killer.

Schrott, who is only the stepfather of his wife's sons, has a row with her and drives off with murder in mind. Thinking the dummy is a dead  Annemarie, he screams in terror. When Matthäi approaches, Schrott attacks and wounds him, but is felled by a shot from the police.

Cast
 Heinz Rühmann as Oberleutnant Matthäi
 Sigfrit Steiner as Detektiv Feller
 Siegfried Lowitz as Leutnant Heinzi
 Michel Simon as Jacquier
 Heinrich Gretler as Polizeikommandant [Chief of Police]
 Gert Fröbe as Herr Schrott
 Berta Drews as Frau Schrott
 Ewald Balser as Professor Manz (voiced in English version by Roger Livesey)
 María Rosa Salgado as Frau Heller
 Anita von Ow as Annemarie Heller, her daughter
 Barbara Haller as Ursula Fehlmann
 Emil Hegetschweiler as Gemeindepräsident [town mayor]
 Ettore Cella as Tankstellenbesitzer [Gas station owner]

Production

Filming took place from 22 February to April 1958 near Zürich and Chur. Interiors were shot at  Atelier and the Spandau Studios in Berlin.

Release
The film premiered on 4 July 1958 at the IFF/Berlin. It went on general release on 9 July 1958. In Switzerland it premiered on 12 July 1958 (Rex, Zürich).

Awards
The film was nominated for the Golden Bear at the Berlin International Film Festival.

Adaptations

Remakes
 In 1979, an Italian remake, directed by Alberto Negrin, under the title La promessa was released.
 In 1990, a Hungarian remake, directed by György Fehér, under the title Szürkület was released.
 In 1995, a Dutch remake, directed by Rudolf Van Den Berg, under the title The Cold Light of Day was released.
 In 1997, a German tv film remake, directed by Nico Hofmann, under the original title Es geschah am hellichten Tag was released.
 In 2001, an English remake, directed by Sean Penn, under the title The Pledge was released.
 In 2018, a Tamil partial adaptation, directed by Ram kumar, under the title Ratsasan was released.
 In 2019, a Telugu remake of the above mentioned movie Ratsasan, directed by Ramesh Varma, under the title Rakshasudu was released.

Alternative versions
This failure ultimately leaves the detective a broken and witless old man.

American director Sean Penn made a fifth movie on the same theme, named The Pledge in 2001, starring Jack Nicholson and Helen Mirren. Penn's movie incorporates  darker ending, as preferred by Dürrenmatt.

References

External links
 

1958 films
1958 crime drama films
1950s thriller films
Swiss thriller films
German thriller films
West German films
1950s German-language films
German black-and-white films
Spanish black-and-white films
Swiss black-and-white films
Works by Friedrich Dürrenmatt
Films directed by Ladislao Vajda
Films set in Switzerland
1950s serial killer films
Films shot at Spandau Studios
1950s German films